Gabon, officially the Gabonese Republic, is a country on the west coast of Central Africa. Located on the equator, it is bordered by Equatorial Guinea to the northwest, Cameroon to the north, the Republic of the Congo on the east and south, and the Gulf of Guinea to the west. There are coastal plains, mountains (the Cristal Mountains and the Chaillu Massif in the centre), and a savanna in the east.

Since its independence from France in 1960, the sovereign state of Gabon has had three presidents. In the 1990s, it introduced a multi-party system and a democratic constitution that aimed for a more transparent electoral process and reformed some governmental institutions. Despite this, the Gabonese Democratic Party (PDG) remains the dominant party. With petroleum and foreign private investment, it has the fourth highest HDI in the region (after Mauritius, Seychelles and South Africa) and the fifth highest GDP per capita (PPP) in all of Africa (after Seychelles, Mauritius, Equatorial Guinea and Botswana). Its GDP grew by more than 6% per year from 2010 to 2012.

The official language is French. Bantu ethnic groups constitute around 95% of the country's population, and Christianity is the most practiced religion, being practiced by between 55–75% of the population.

History 

Pygmy peoples in the area were largely replaced and absorbed by Bantu tribes as they migrated. By the 18th century, a Myeni-speaking kingdom known as the Kingdom of Orungu formed as a trading centre with the ability to purchase and sell slaves, and fell with the demise of the slave trade in the 1870s.

Explorer Pierre Savorgnan de Brazza led his first mission to the Gabon-Congo area in 1875. He founded the town of Franceville and was later colonial governor. Some Bantu groups lived in the area when France officially occupied it in 1885.

In 1910, Gabon became a territory of French Equatorial Africa, a federation that survived until 1958. In World War II, the Allies invaded Gabon in order to overthrow the pro-Vichy France colonial administration. On 28 November 1958, Gabon became an autonomous republic within the French Community, and on 17 August 1960, it became fully independent.

The first president of Gabon, elected in 1961, was Léon M'ba, with Omar Bongo Ondimba as his vice president. After M'ba's accession to power, the press was suppressed, political demonstrations suppressed, freedom of expression curtailed, other political parties gradually excluded from power, and the Constitution changed along French lines to vest power in the Presidency, a post that M'ba assumed himself. When M'ba dissolved the National Assembly in January 1964 to institute one-party rule, an army coup sought to oust him from power and restore parliamentary democracy. French paratroopers flew in within 24 hours to restore M'ba to power. After days of fighting, the coup ended and the opposition was imprisoned, with protests and riots.

When M'Ba died in 1967, Bongo replaced him as president. In March 1968, Bongo declared Gabon a 1-party state by dissolving BDG and establishing a new party – the Parti Democratique Gabonais (PDG). He invited all Gabonese, regardless of previous political affiliation, to participate. Bongo sought to forge a single national movement in support of the government's development policies, using PDG as a tool to submerge the regional and tribal rivalries that had divided Gabonese politics in the past. Bongo was elected president in February 1975; in April 1975, the position of vice president was abolished and replaced by the position of prime minister, who had no right to automatic succession. Bongo was re-elected President in December 1979 and November 1986 to 7-year terms.

In 1990, economic discontent and a desire for political liberalization provoked demonstrations and strikes by students and workers. In response to grievances by workers, Bongo negotiated with them on a sector-by-sector basis, making wage concessions. He promised to open up PDG and to organize a national political conference in March–April 1990 to discuss Gabon's future political system. PDG and 74 political organizations attended the conference. Participants essentially divided into 2 "loose" coalitions, ruling PDG and its allies, and the United Front of Opposition Associations and Parties, consisting of the breakaway Morena Fundamental and the Gabonese Progress Party.

The April 1990 conference approved political reforms, including creation of a national Senate, decentralization of the budgetary process, freedom of assembly and press, and cancellation of an exit visa requirement. In an attempt to guide the political system's transformation to multiparty democracy, Bongo resigned as PDG chairman and created a transitional government headed by a new Prime Minister, Casimir Oye-Mba. The Gabonese Social Democratic Grouping (RSDG), as the resulting government was called, was smaller than the previous government and included representatives from some opposition parties in its cabinet. RSDG drafted a provisional constitution in May 1990 that provided a basic bill of rights and an independent judiciary and retained "strong" executive powers for the president. After further review by a constitutional committee and the National Assembly, this document came into force in March 1991.

Opposition to PDG continued after the April 1990 conference, and in September 1990, 2 coup d'état attempts were uncovered and aborted. With demonstrations after the death of an opposition leader, the first multiparty National Assembly elections in almost 30 years took place in September–October 1990, with PDG garnering a majority.

Following President Omar Bongo's re-election in December 1993 with 51% of the vote, opposition candidates refused to validate the election results. Civil disturbances and violent repression led to an agreement between the government and opposition factions to work toward a political settlement. These talks led to the Paris Accords in November 1994, under which some opposition figures were included in a government of national unity. This arrangement broke down and the 1996 and 1997 legislative and municipal elections provided the background for renewed partisan politics. PDG won in the legislative election, and some cities, including Libreville, elected opposition mayors during the 1997 local election.

Facing a divided opposition, President Omar Bongo coasted to re-election in December 1998. While some Bongo's opponents rejected the outcome as fraudulent, some international observers characterized the results as representative "despite many perceived irregularities". Legislative elections held in 2001–2002 were boycotted by a number of smaller opposition parties and were criticized for their administrative weaknesses, produced a National Assembly dominated by PDG and allied independents. In November 2005 President Omar Bongo was elected for his sixth term. He won re-election, and opponents claim that the balloting process was marred by irregularities. There were some instances of violence following the announcement of his win. National Assembly elections were held in December 2006. Some seats contested because of voting irregularities were overturned by the Constitutional Court, and the subsequent run-off elections in 2007 yielded a PDG-controlled National Assembly.

On 8 June 2009, President Omar Bongo died of cardiac arrest at a Spanish hospital in Barcelona. In accordance with the amended constitution, Rose Francine Rogombé, the President of the Senate, became Interim President on 10 June 2009. The first contested elections in Gabon's history that did not include Omar Bongo as a candidate were held on 30 August 2009, with 18 candidates for president. The lead-up to the elections saw some isolated protests. Omar Bongo's son, ruling party leader Ali Bongo Ondimba, was formally declared the winner after a 3-week review by the Constitutional Court; his inauguration took place on 16 October 2009. The court's review had been prompted by claims of fraud by some opposition candidates, with the initial announcement of election results sparking violent protests in Port-Gentil. The citizens of Port-Gentil took to the streets, and some shops and residences were burned, including the French Consulate and a local prison. Officially, 4 deaths occurred during the riots. Gendarmes and the military were deployed to Port-Gentil to support the beleaguered police, and a curfew was in effect for more than 3 months.

A partial legislative by-election was held in June 2010. A coalition of parties, the Union Nationale (UN), participated for the first time. UN is composed mostly of PDG defectors who left the party after Omar Bongo's death. Of the 5 contested seats, PDG won 3 and UN won 2; both sides claimed victory.

In January 2019, there was an attempted coup d'état led by soldiers against the President Ali Bongo; the coup ultimately failed.

In June 2022, Gabon and Togo joined the Commonwealth of Nations.

Politics 

The presidential republic form of government is stated under the 1961 constitution (revised in 1975, rewritten in 1991, and revised in 2003). The president is elected by universal suffrage for a 7-year term; a 2003 constitutional amendment removed presidential term limits. The president can appoint and dismiss the prime minister, the cabinet, and judges of the independent Supreme Court. The president has other powers such as authority to dissolve the National Assembly, declare a state of siege, delay legislation, and conduct referendums. Gabon has a bicameral legislature with a National Assembly and Senate. The National Assembly has 120 deputies who are popularly elected for a 5-year term. The Senate is composed of 102 members who are elected by municipal councils and regional assemblies and serve for 6 years. The Senate was created in the 1990–1991 constitutional revision, and was not brought into being until after the 1997 local elections. The President of the Senate is next in succession to the President.

In 1990, the government made changes to Gabon's political system. A transitional constitution was drafted in May 1990 as an outgrowth of the national political conference in March–April and later revised by a constitutional committee. Among its provisions were a Western-style bill of rights, creation of a National Council of Democracy to oversee the guarantee of those rights, a governmental advisory board on economic and social issues, and an independent judiciary. After approval by the National Assembly, PDG Central Committee, and the President, the Assembly unanimously adopted the constitution in March 1991. Multiparty legislative elections were held in 1990–91 when opposition parties had not been declared formally legal. In January 1991, the Assembly passed by unanimous vote a law governing the legalization of opposition parties.

After President Omar Bongo was re-elected in 1993, in a disputed election where only 51% of votes were cast, social and political disturbances led to the 1994 Paris Conference and Accords. These provided a framework for the next elections. Local and legislative elections were delayed until 1996–97. In 1997, constitutional amendments put forward years earlier were adopted to create the Senate and the position of vice president, and to extend the president's term to 7 years.

In October 2009, President Ali Bongo Ondimba began efforts to streamline the government. In an effort to reduce corruption and government bloat, he eliminated 17 minister-level positions, abolished the vice presidency and reorganized the portfolios of some ministries, bureaus and directorates. In November 2009, President Bongo Ondimba announced a new vision for the modernization of Gabon, called "Gabon Emergent". This program contains 3 pillars: Green Gabon, Service Gabon, and Industrial Gabon. The goals of Gabon Emergent are to diversify the economy so that Gabon becomes less reliant on petroleum, to eliminate corruption, and to modernize the workforce. Under this program, exports of raw timber have been banned, a government-wide census was held, the work day has been changed to eliminate a long midday break, and a national oil company was created.

On 25 January 2011, opposition leader André Mba Obame claimed the presidency, saying the country should be run by someone the people really wanted. He selected 19 ministers for his government, and the entire group, along with hundreds of others, spent the night at UN headquarters. On January 26, the government dissolved Mba Obame's party. AU chairman Jean Ping said that Mba Obame's action "hurts the integrity of legitimate institutions and also endangers the peace, the security and the stability of Gabon." Interior Minister Jean-François Ndongou accused Mba Obame and his supporters of treason. The UN Secretary-General, Ban Ki-moon, said that he recognized Ondimba as the only official Gabonese president.

The 2016 presidential election was disputed, with "very close" official results reported. Protests broke out in the capital and met a repression which culminated in the alleged bombing of opposition party headquarters by the presidential guard. Between 50 and 100 citizens were killed by security forces and 1,000 arrested. International observers criticized irregularities, including unnaturally high turnout reported for some districts. The country's supreme court threw out some suspect precincts, and the ballots have been destroyed. The election was declared in favor of the incumbent Ondimba. The European Parliament issued 2 resolutions denouncing the unclear results of the election and calling for an investigation on the human rights violations.

Foreign relations 

Since independence, Gabon has followed a nonaligned policy, advocating dialogue in international affairs and recognizing each side of divided countries. In intra-African affairs, it espouses development by evolution rather than revolution and favors regulated private enterprise as the system most likely to promote rapid economic growth. It involved itself in mediation efforts in Chad, the Central African Republic, Angola, the Republic of the Congo, the Democratic Republic of the Congo (D.R.C.), and Burundi. In December 1999, through the mediation efforts of President Bongo, a peace accord was signed in the Republic of the Congo (Brazzaville) between the government and most leaders of an armed rebellion. President Bongo was involved in the continuing D.R.C. peace process, and played a role in mediating the crisis in Ivory Coast.

Gabon is a member of the United Nations (UN) and some of its specialized and related agencies, and of the World Bank; the IMF; the African Union (AU); the Central African Customs Union/Central African Economic and Monetary Community (UDEAC/CEMAC); EU/ACP association under the Lomé Convention; the Communaute Financiere Africaine (CFA); the Organization of the Islamic Conference (OIC); the Nonaligned Movement; and the Economic Community of Central African States (ECCAS/CEEAC). In 1995, Gabon withdrew from the Organization of the Petroleum Exporting Countries (OPEC), rejoining in 2016. Gabon was elected to a non-permanent seat on the United Nations Security Council for January 2010 through December 2011 and held the rotating presidency in March 2010.

Military 

It has a professional military of about 5,000 personnel, divided into army, navy, air force, gendarmerie, and police force.  A 1,800-member guard provides security for the president.

Administrative divisions 

It is divided into 9 provinces which are subdivided into 50 departments. The president appoints the provincial governors, the prefects, and the subprefects.

The provinces are (capitals in parentheses):
Estuaire (Libreville)
Haut-Ogooué (Franceville)
Moyen-Ogooué (Lambaréné)
Ngounié (Mouila)
Nyanga (Tchibanga)
Ogooué-Ivindo (Makokou)
Ogooué-Lolo (Koulamoutou)
Ogooué-Maritime (Port-Gentil)
Woleu-Ntem (Oyem)

Geography 

It is located on the Atlantic coast of central Africa on the equator, between latitudes 3°N and 4°S, and longitudes 8° and 15°E. Gabon has an equatorial climate with a system of rainforests, with 89.3% of its land area forested.

The coastal plains form a section of the World Wildlife Fund's Atlantic Equatorial coastal forests ecoregion and contain patches of Central African mangroves including on the Muni River estuary on the border with Equatorial Guinea.

Geologically, Gabon is primarily Archean and Paleoproterozoic igneous and metamorphic basement rock, belonging to the stable continental crust of the Congo Craton. Some formations are more than 2 billion years old. Some rock units are overlain by marine carbonate, lacustrine and continental sedimentary rocks, and unconsolidated sediments and soils that formed in the last 2.5 million years of the Quaternary. The rifting apart of the supercontinent Pangaea created rift basins that filled with sediments and formed the hydrocarbons. There are Oklo reactor zones, a natural nuclear fission reactor on Earth which was active 2 billion years ago. The site was discovered during uranium mining in the 1970s to supply the French nuclear power industry.

It has 3 karst areas where there are hundreds of caves located in the dolomite and limestone rocks. A National Geographic Expedition visited some caves in the summer of 2008 to document them.

In 2002, President Omar Bongo Ondimba designated roughly 10% of the nation's territory to be part of its national park system (with 13 parks in total). The National Agency for National Parks manages Gabon's national park system. Gabon had a 2018 Forest Landscape Integrity Index mean score of 9.07/10, ranking it 9th globally out of 172 countries.

Economy 

Oil revenues constitute roughly 46% of the government's budget, 43% of the gross domestic product (GDP), and 81% of exports. Oil production declined from its higher point of 370,000 barrels per day in 1997. Some estimates suggest that Gabonese oil will be expended by 2025. Planning is beginning for an after-oil scenario.

"Overspending" on the Trans-Gabon Railway, the CFA franc devaluation of 1994, and periods of lower oil prices caused debt problems.

Successive International Monetary Fund (IMF) missions have criticized the Gabon government for overspending on off-budget items (in good years and bad), over-borrowing from the central bank, and slipping on the schedule for privatization and administrative reform. In September 2005 Gabon successfully concluded a 15-month Stand-By Arrangement with IMF. A 3-year Stand-By Arrangement with IMF was approved in May 2007. Because of the financial crisis and social developments surrounding the death of President Omar Bongo and the elections, Gabon was unable to meet its economic goals under the Stand-By Arrangement in 2009.

Gabon's oil revenues have given it a per capita GDP of $8,600. A "skewed income distribution" and "poor social indicators" are "evident". The richest 20% of the population earn over 90% of the income while about a third of the Gabonese population lives in poverty.

The economy is dependent on extraction. Before the discovery of oil, logging was the "pillar" of the Gabonese economy. Then, logging and manganese mining are the "next-most-important" income generators. Some explorations suggest the presence of the world's largest unexploited iron ore deposit. For some who live in rural areas without access to employment opportunity in extractive industries, remittances from family members in urban areas or subsistence activities provide income.

Foreign and local observers have lamented the lack of diversity in the Gabonese economy. Factors that have "limited the development of new industries" were listed as follows:
 the market is "small", about a million
 dependent on imports from France
 unable to capitalize on regional markets
 entrepreneurial zeal not always present among the Gabonese
 a "fairly regular" stream of oil "rent", even if it is diminishing

Further investment in the agricultural or tourism sectors is "complicated by poor infrastructure". Some processing and service sectors are "largely dominated by a few prominent local investors".

At World Bank and IMF insistence, the government embarked in the 1990s on a program of privatization of its state-owned companies and administrative reform, including reducing public sector employment and salary growth. A government has voiced a commitment to work toward an economic transformation of the country.

Demographics 

It has a population of approximately  million. Historical and environmental factors caused its population to decline between 1900 and 1940. It has "one of the lowest population densities of any country in Africa", and the fourth highest Human Development Index in Sub-Saharan Africa.

Ethnic groups 
Gabon has at least 40 ethnic groups, including Fang, Myènè, Punu-Échira, Nzebi-Adouma, Teke-Mbete, Mèmbè, Kota, Akélé. There are indigenous Pygmy peoples: the Bongo, and Baka. The latter speak the only non-Bantu language in Gabon. More than 10,000 native French live in Gabon, including an estimated 2,000 dual nationals.

Some ethnicities are spread throughout Gabon, leading to contact, interaction among the groups, and intermarriage. Among some tribes, marriage within the same tribe is prohibited because it is regarded as incest.

Population centres

Languages 

French is the sole official language. It is estimated that 80% of the population can speak French, and that 30% of Libreville residents are native speakers of the language.

Nationally, a majority of the Gabonese people speak indigenous languages, according to their ethnic group, while this proportion is lower than in most other Sub-Saharan African countries. The 2013 census found that 63.7% of Gabon's population could speak a Gabonese language, broken down by 86.3% in rural areas and 60.5% in urban areas speaking at least one national language.

Religion 

Religions practised in Gabon include Christianity (Roman Catholicism and Protestantism), Islam, and traditional indigenous religious beliefs. Some people practice elements of both Christianity and indigenous religious beliefs. Approximately 79% of the population (53% Catholic) practice one of the denominations of Christianity; 10% practice Islam (mainly Sunni); the remainder practice other religions.

Health 

A private hospital was established in 1913 in Lambaréné by Albert Schweitzer. By 1985 there were 28 hospitals, 87 medical centers, and 312 infirmaries and dispensaries. , there were an estimated 29 physicians per 100,000 people, and "approximately 90% of the population had access to health care services".

In 2000, 70% of the population had access to "safe drinking water" and 21% had "adequate sanitation". A government health program treats such diseases as leprosy, sleeping sickness, malaria, filariasis, intestinal worms, and tuberculosis. Rates for immunization of children under the age of 1 were 97% for tuberculosis and 65% for polio. Immunization rates for DPT and measles were 37% and 56% respectively. Gabon has a domestic supply of pharmaceuticals from a factory in Libreville.

The total fertility rate has decreased from 5.8 in 1960 to 4.2 children per mother during childbearing years in 2000. 10% of all births were "low birth weight". The maternal mortality rate was 520 per 100,000 live births as of 1998. In 2005, the infant mortality rate was 55.35 per 1,000 live births and life expectancy was 55.02 years. As of 2002, the overall mortality rate was estimated at 17.6 per 1,000 inhabitants.

The HIV/AIDS prevalence is estimated to be 5.2% of the adult population (ages 15–49). , approximately 46,000 people were living with HIV/AIDS. There were an estimated 2,400 deaths from AIDS in 2009 – down from 3,000 deaths in 2003.

Education 

Its education system is regulated by 2 ministries: the Ministry of Education, in charge of pre-kindergarten through the last high school grade, and the Ministry of Higher Education and Innovative Technologies, in charge of universities, higher education, and professional schools.

Education is compulsory for children ages 6 to 16 under the Education Act. Some children in Gabon start their school lives by attending nurseries or "Crèche", then kindergarten known as "Jardins d'Enfants". At age 6, they are enrolled in primary school, "École Primaire" which is made up of 6 grades. The next level is "École Secondaire", which is made up of 7 grades. The planned graduation age is 19 years old. Those who graduate can apply for admission at institutions of higher learning, including engineering schools or business schools. As of 2012, the literacy rate of a population ages 15 and above was 82%.

The government has used oil revenue for school construction, paying teachers' salaries, and promoting education, including in rural areas. Maintenance of school structures, and teachers' salaries, has been declining. In 2002 the gross primary enrollment rate was 132%, and in 2000 the net primary enrollment rate was 78%. Gross and net enrollment ratios are based on the number of students formally registered in primary school. As of 2001, 69% of children who started primary school were "likely" to reach grade 5. Problems in the education system include "poor management and planning, lack of oversight, poorly qualified teachers", and "overcrowded classrooms".

Culture 

A country with a primarily oral tradition up until the spread of literacy in the 21st century, it has folklore and mythology. "Raconteurs" are working to keep traditions alive such as the mvett among the Fangs and the ingwala among the Nzebis.

It features internationally celebrated masks such as the n'goltang (Fang) and the reliquary figures of the Kota. Each group has its own set of masks used. They are used in ceremonies such as marriage, birth and funerals. Traditionalists work with "rare local woods and other precious materials".

Music 

It has an array of folk styles. Imported rock and hip hop from the US and UK are in Gabon, as are rumba, makossa and soukous. Some folk instruments include the obala, the ngombi, the balafon and drums.

Media 

Radio-Diffusion Télévision Gabonaise (RTG) which is owned and operated by the government broadcasts in French and indigenous languages. Color television broadcasts have been introduced in some cities. In 1981, a commercial radio station, Africa No. 1, began operations. It has participation from the French and Gabonese governments and private European media.

In 2004, the government operated 2 radio stations and another 7 were privately owned. There were 2 government television stations and 4 privately owned. In 2003, there were an estimated 488 radios and 308 television sets for every 1,000 people. About 11.5 of every 1,000 people were cable subscribers. In 2003, there were 22.4 personal computers for every 1,000 people and 26 of every 1,000 people had access to the Internet. The national press service is the Gabonese Press Agency which publishes a daily paper, Gabon-Matin (circulation 18,000 as of 2002).

L'Union in Libreville, the government-controlled daily newspaper, had an average daily circulation of 40,000 in 2002. The weekly Gabon d'Aujourdhui is published by the Ministry of Communications. There are about 9 privately owned periodicals which are either independent or affiliated with political parties. These publish in certain numbers that have been delayed by financial constraints. The constitution of Gabon provides for free speech and a free press, and the government supports these rights. Some periodicals actively criticize the government and foreign publications are available.

Cuisine 

Gabonese cuisine is influenced by French cuisine, and staple foods are available.

Sports
 
The Gabon national football team has represented the nation since 1962. The Under-23 football team won the 2011 CAF U-23 Championship and qualified for the 2012 London Olympics. Gabon were joint hosts, along with Equatorial Guinea, of the 2012 Africa Cup of Nations, and the sole hosts of the competition's 2017 tournament.

The Gabon national basketball team, nicknamed Les Panthères, finished 8th at the AfroBasket 2015.

Gabon has competed at most Summer Olympics since 1972. Its Olympic medallist Anthony Obame won a silver medal in taekwondo at the 2012 Olympics held in London.

Gabon has recreational fishing and is considered the "best place in the world" to catch Atlantic tarpon.

See also 
 Index of Gabon-related articles
 Outline of Gabon
 Lambaréné
 Hôpital Albert Schweitzer

References

Bibliography

External links 

Gabon. The World Factbook. Central Intelligence Agency.

Gabon from the BBC News

 Key Development Forecasts for Gabon from International Futures
2009 report (PDF) from Direction générale de la statistique et des études économiques

 
Central African countries
Former French colonies
French-speaking countries and territories
Member states of the Commonwealth of Nations
Member states of the Organisation internationale de la Francophonie
Member states of the African Union
Member states of the Organisation of Islamic Cooperation
Member states of OPEC
Member states of the United Nations
Republics
Republics in the Commonwealth of Nations
States and territories established in 1960
1960 establishments in Africa
Countries in Africa